Direct Action was an English-language newspaper published in Sydney, New South Wales, Australia.  It was published in tabloid format.

History
The paper's first issue was published on 31 January 1914 by the Industrial Workers of the World, Australian Administration.  It was a monthly publication concerned with socialism and industrial unionism.

Digitisation
The various versions of the paper have been digitised as part of the Australian Newspapers Digitisation Program, a project hosted by the National Library of Australia.

See also
 List of newspapers in New South Wales
 List of newspapers in Australia

References

External links

Bibliography
 Two hundred years of Sydney newspapers : a short history, by Victor Isaacs and Rod Kirkpatrick, North Richmond, N.S.W. : Rural Press, 2003. 
 Looking good : the changing appearance of Australian newspapers / by Victor Isaacs, for the Australian Newspapers History Group, Middle Park, Qld. : Australian Newspaper History Group, 2007. 
 Press timeline : Select chronology of significant Australian press events to 2011 / Compiled by Rod Kirkpatrick for the Australian Newspaper History Group 
 Australian Newspaper History : A Bibliography / Compiled by Victor Isaacs, Rod Kirkpatrick and John Russell, Middle Park, Qld. : Australian Newspaper History Group, 2004. 
 Newspapers in Australian libraries : a union list. 4th ed. 

Defunct newspapers published in Sydney
Industrial Workers of the World publications
Publications established in 1914